Revista Brasileira de Biologia (abbreviated Revista Brasil. Biol.) was an academic journal about biology published in Río de Janeiro, Brazil, from 1941 until 2000. It was continued by Brazilian Journal of Biology.

References

External links 
 Revista Brasileira de Biologia on SciELO
 Description on IPNI
 
Publications established in 1941
Portuguese-language journals
Academic journals published in Brazil
Botany journals
Biology journals